Laurence George Yates (29 June 1922 – 24 April 1990) was an Australian rules footballer who played with Collingwood in the Victorian Football League (VFL).

Notes

External links 
		
Profile on Collingwood Forever	
		
		
		
		
1922 births		
1990 deaths		
Australian rules footballers from Victoria (Australia)		
Collingwood Football Club players